12th Infantry Regiment (Polish language: 12 Pulk Piechoty, 12 pp) was an infantry regiment of the Polish Army. It existed from 1918 until 1939. Garrisoned in Wadowice, the unit belonged to the 6th Infantry Division from Kraków.

The regiment celebrated its holiday on August 1, the anniversary of the 1920 Battle Of Leszniow, against the Red Army. During the 1939 Invasion of Poland, it belonged to Kraków Army, together with the 6th Infantry Division.

Commandants 
 Colonel Jan Mischke (1918–1919), 
 Captain Franciszek Alter (1919), 
 Colonel Eugeniusz Stecz (1919), 
 Major Adam Smialowski (1919), 
 Colonel Edward Reyman (1919), 
 Captain Oswald Frank (1919), 
 Colonel Wandalin Doroszkiewicz (1919 – 10 1920), 
 Captain Wladyslaw Mielnik (1920), 
 Major Franciszek Alter (1920–1921), 
 Colonel Oswald Frank (1921–1927), 
 Colonel Jozef Cwiertniak (1927–1929), 
 Colonel Jozef Jaklicz (1929–1932), 
 Colonel Marian Raczynski (1932–1933), 
 Colonel Antoni Staich (1933–1935), 
 Colonel Aleksander Stawarz (1935–1939), 
 Colonel Marian Strazyc (1939).

Symbols 
The flag of the regiment, funded by the residents of Wadowice, Andrychow and Kalwaria Zebrzydowska, was handed to the unit by General Stanisław Szeptycki, on August 1, 1924.

The badge was accepted on 1931. It was in the shape of the shield, with a cross in the middle, and the initials 12 PP.

Sources 
 Kazimierz Satora: Opowieści wrześniowych sztandarów. Warszawa: Instytut Wydawniczy Pax, 1990
 Zdzisław Jagiełło: Piechota Wojska Polskiego 1918–1939. Warszawa: Bellona, 2007

See also 
 1939 Infantry Regiment (Poland)

Infantry regiments of Poland
Military units and formations established in 1918
Military units and formations disestablished in 1939
Military units and formations of Poland in World War II